Victor Frank Eastop FLS FRESB (1924 – 2012) was a British entomologist. He was born in London, UK. He went to University of Reading but his time as an undergraduate was interrupted by four years in the RAF (1943–47) 

Back at Reading, he obtained his first degree in 1950 and then received an Agricultural Research Council grant to work on aphids at University of Cambridge, completing his MSc in 1952 and PhD in 1955.

Much of Eastop’s taxonomic work was based on the accurate measurement of aphid body parts under the microscope, he developed the understanding of how these measurements varied according to the conditions under which the insects developed. Interpreting such variation correctly is vital for correct identification of species.

In 1952, Eastop was awarded a Colonial Office Research Fellowship to study aphids in East Africa, after which he joined the staff of the British Museum (Natural History) as a Senior Scientific Officer. He was also a visiting scientist to New Zealand (in 1959, 1972 and 1983), Israel (1982),  Beijing (1985) and had visiting professorships in Brazil (1972–73), Sweden (1973 and 1978), and Iran (1978). He served as President (1987–89) of the Royal Entomological Society.

Selected publications
 
 
 
 
 
 
 
 
 
  
  Abstract for 2nd edition
  Abstract

References

1924 births
2012 deaths
British entomologists
Fellows of the Royal Entomological Society
Alumni of the University of Cambridge
Alumni of the University of Reading